Yazd, formerly also known as Yezd, is the capital of Yazd Province, Iran. At the 2016 census, the population was 529,673. Since 2017, the historical city of Yazd is recognized as a World Heritage Site by UNESCO.

Because of generations of adaptations to its desert surroundings, Yazd has a unique Persian architecture. It is nicknamed the "City of Windcatchers" ( Shahr-e Badgirha) from its many examples. It is also very well known for its Zoroastrian fire temples, ab anbars (cisterns), qanats (underground channels), yakhchals (coolers), Persian handicrafts, handwoven cloth (Persian termeh), silk weaving, Persian cotton candy, and its time-honored confectioneries. Yazd is also known as City of Bicycles, because of its old history of bike riders, and the highest number of bicycles per capita in Iran. It is reported that bicycle culture in Iran originated in Yazd as a result of contact with European visitors and tourists in the last century.

Name 
Yazd means "pure" and "holy"; Yazd City means "City of the Holy [One, i. e., God]".
Former names of this city: Kath, Isatis.

History 

Archeological evidence 12 kilometers north of Yazd suggests that the area has been populated since the period of the Achaemenid Empire (550 BC–330 BC). In his Natural History, Pliny the Elder (died 79 AD) mentions a town in the Parthian Empire (247 BC–224 AD) named "Issatis", which is seemingly connected to the name of the Asagarta/Istachae/Sagartians. As a result, some scholars have suggested that the name of Yazd was derived from Issatis (also transliterated as Isatichae, Ysatis, Yasatis), and that the latter name started to be used in the Median or Achaemenid eras.

The area encompassing Yazd first started to gain prominence in the Late antiquity, namely under the Sasanian Empire (224–651). Under Yazdegerd I, a mint was established in Yazd (under the mint abbreviation of "YZ"), which demonstrates its increasing importance. According to the New Persian chronicle Tarikh-i Yazd ("History of Yazd") of 1441, Yazd was re-founded by "Yazdegerd, son of Bahram", i.e. Yazdegerd II. The word yazd means God. After the Muslim conquest of Persia, many Zoroastrians migrated to Yazd from neighboring provinces. By paying a levy, Yazd was allowed to remain Zoroastrian even after its conquest, and Islam only gradually became the dominant religion in the city.

Because of its remote desert location and the difficulty of access, Yazd remained largely immune to large battles and the destruction and ravages of war. For instance, it was a haven for those fleeing from destruction in other parts of Persian Empire during the Mongol invasion. In 1272 it was visited by Marco Polo, who remarked on the city's fine silk-weaving industry. In the book The Travels of Marco Polo, he described Yazd in the following way:

Yazd briefly served as the capital of the Muzaffarid Dynasty in the fourteenth century, and was unsuccessfully besieged in 1350–1351 by the Injuids under Shaikh Abu Ishaq. The Friday (or Congregation) mosque, arguably the city's greatest architectural landmark, as well as other important buildings, date to this period. During the Qajar dynasty (18th century AD) it was ruled by the Bakhtiari Khans.

Under the rule of the Safavids (16th century), some people migrated from Yazd and settled in an area that is today on the Iran-Afghanistan border. The settlement, which was named Yazdi, was located in what is now Farah City in the province of the same name in Afghanistan. Even today, people from this area speak with an accent very similar to that of the people of Yazd.

One of the notable things about Yazd is its family-centered culture. According to official statistics from Iran's National Organization for Civil Registration, Yazd is among the three cities with the lowest divorce rates in Iran.

Demographics

Language and ethnic groups 
The majority of the people of Yazd are Persians. They speak Persian with a Yazdi accent, which is different from the Persian accent of Tehran.

Religion 

The majority of people in Yazd are Shia Muslim. Yazd is a strongly religious, traditionalist and conservative city. Several city traditions are the Muslim parades and gatherings, which are mainly processions called azadari held to commemorate the events experienced by the main Islamic martyrs and other important figures. These huge public gatherings created a series of spaces which, since most are near important urban monuments, are used at other times as hubs from which visitors can tour the main spots in the city.

There is also a sizable population of Zoroastrians in the city. In 2013, Sepanta Niknam was elected to the city council of Yazd and became the first Zoroastrian councillor in Iran. The Pir-e-Naraki sanctuary is one of the important pilgrimage destinations for Zoroastrians, where an annual congregation is held and frequent visits are made during the year; it is now also a famous tourist spot. The story of the last Persian prince to come to Yazd before the arrival of Islam adds to its importance. Such a transformation has occurred several times.

There was once a relatively large Jewish-Yazdi community, however, after the creation of Israel, many have moved there for varying reasons. Former president of Israel Moshe Katsav is an example.

Population
At the 2006 census, the population of the city of Yazd was 423,006 in 114,716 households. The following census in 2011 counted 486,152 people in 141,572 households. The latest census in 2016 showed a population of 529,673 people in 158,368 households.

Historical sites

Yazd is an important centre of Iranian architecture. Because of its climate, it has one of the largest networks of qanats (underground water supply systems) in the world, and Yazdi qanat makers are considered the most skilled in Iran.

To deal with the extremely hot summers, many old buildings in Yazd have magnificent wind towers and large underground areas.

The city is also home to prime examples of yakhchals, which were used to store ice retrieved from glaciers in the nearby mountains. Yazd is also one of the largest cities built almost entirely out of adobe.

Yazd's heritage as a center of Zoroastrianism is also important. There is a Tower of Silence on the outskirts, and the city has an ateshkadeh which holds a fire that has been kept alight continuously since 470 AD. Zoroastrians make up a significant minority of the population, around 20,000–40,000 or 5 to 10 percent.

The 11th-century brick mausoleum and shrine Davāzdah Imām is the oldest dated building in the city.

Built in 12th century and still in use, Jame Mosque of Yazd is an example of the finest Persian mosaics and excellent architecture. Its minarets are the highest in the country. Tomb of Sayyed Rukn ad-Din is nearby the mosque.

Geography

Climate 
Yazd has a hot desert climate (Köppen climate classification BWh). Even at night the temperatures in summer are rather uncomfortable. In the winter, the days remain mild and sunny, but in the morning the thin air and low cloudiness cause cold temperatures that can sometimes fall well below .

Economy 
Always known for the quality of its silk and carpets, Yazd today is one of Iran's industrial centers for textiles. There is also a considerable ceramics and construction materials industry and unique confectionery and jewellery industries. A significant portion of the population is also employed in other industries including agriculture, dairy, metal works, and machine manufacturing. There are a number of companies involved in the growing information technology industry, mainly manufacturing primary materials such as cables and connectors. Currently Yazd is the home of the largest manufacturer of fibre optics in Iran.

Yazd's confectioneries have a tremendous following throughout Iran and have been a source of tourism for the city. Confectioners workshops (khalifehs, or experts) keep their recipes a guarded secret, and there are many that have remained a private family business for many generations. Baklava, ghotab and pashmak are the most popular sweets made in the city.

In 2000 the Yazd Water Museum opened; it features exhibits of water storage vessels and historical technologies related to water.

Yazd has expanded its industrial fields since the 1980s. With at least three main industrial areas each containing over 70 different factories, Yazd has become one of the most technologically advanced cities of Iran.

Transportation 
In addition to its connection with major Iranian cities via Iranian Railways, Yazd is served by the Shahid Sadooghi Airport.

Politics

 Eskandar Aslani (circa 1979)
 Muhammad-Ali Vahdati
 Ali-Akbar Farshi
 Muhammad-Hassan Khorshidnam
 Hosseyn A'laii
 Muhammad-Mahdi Sherafat
 Ali-Akbar Aramun
 Morteza Shayeq
 Ali-Akbar Mirvakili
 Mohammad Azim Zadeh (circa 2017)

Famous residents 

 Mohammad Khatami, former president of Iran; born in Ardakan
 Mohammad Ali Jafari, the commander of the Army of the Guardians of the Islamic Revolution of Iran
 Mohammad Reza Aref, Vice President of Iran from 2001 to 2005
 Mirza Mohammad Farrokhi Yazdi, poet and politician
 Vahshi Bafghi, poet
 Habibollah Bitaraf, former Minister of Energy
 Moshe Katsav, former President of Israel
 Mohammad-Ali Eslami Nodooshan, Iranian author
 Mehdi Azar Yazdi, author of children's stories
 Reza Amrollahi, Head of Atomic Energy Organization of Iran 1981–1997
 Iraj Afshar, bibliographer, historian, and an iconic figure in the field of Persian studies
 Ahmad Fardid, prominent Iranian philosopher and an inspiring and dedicated professor
 Sharaf ad-Din Ali Yazdi, 15th-century Persian historian.
 Zia'eddin Tabatabaee, Iranian politician and the Prime Minister of Iran
 Reza Ardakanian, Iranian professor, politician and the former Minister of Energy of Iran
 Sems Kesmai, poet
 Ardeshir Jamshid Khosraviani, prominent Iranian neurosurgeon and an inspiring and dedicated doctor

Education 

The University of Yazd was established in 1988. It has a college of architecture specializing in traditional Persian art and architecture. Yazd and its nearby towns contain the following institutes of higher education:

Twin towns – sister cities

Yazd is twinned with:

 Holguín, Cuba
 Homs, Syria
 Jászberény, Hungary
 Poti, Georgia

Gallery

See also 

 Iran
 Yazd Province

References

Citations

Bibliography

 .

External links 
 
 
 Rare Photos of Arak, Yazd, Kashan Iranian.com
 Phototour of the desert city (Yazd)

 

Populated places in Yazd County

Cities in Yazd Province

Iranian provincial capitals

World Heritage Sites in Iran